The Foremost Formation is a stratigraphic unit of Late Cretaceous (Campanian) age that underlies much of southern Alberta, Canada.  It was named for outcrops in Chin Coulee near the town of Foremost and is known primarily for its dinosaur remains and other fossils.

Geology 

The Foremost Formation is the basal unit of the Belly River Group (called the Judith River Group in the United States). It gradationally overlies the marine shales of the Pakowki Formation. It consists of sediments that were eroded from the mountains to the west and carried northeastward by river systems, where they gradually prograded into the Western Interior Seaway.

The bottom of the formation typically consists of a basal sandstone unit overlain by the interbedded coal seams, carbonaceous shales and mudstones of the Mackay coal zone. The center portion consists of interbedded sandstones, siltstones and mudstones, with minor carbonaceous shales. At the top are the interbedded coal seams, carbonaceous shales and mudstones of the Taber coal zone. The basal sandstones, which are commonly referred to as the Basal Belly River Sand, are a significant hydrocarbon reservoir in some parts of Alberta.

The Foremost Formation outcrops along the Milk, Oldman and Bow Rivers.

Paleobiota

Invertebrates
A variety of insects preserved in amber such as the ants Haidoterminus  and Boltonimecia have been recovered from the Foremost Formation at a site near Grassy Lake, Alberta.
The formation also includes a variety of freshwater, brackish water and marine molluscs such as Ostrea and Corbula.

Dinosaurs
The Foremost Formation has produced a lower diversity of documented dinosaurs than other Late Cretaceous units in the region unlike the Dinosaur Park Formation, Horseshoe Canyon Formation, and Scollard Formation. This is primarily due to their lower total fossil quantity and neglect from collectors who are hindered by the isolation and scarcity of well-exposed outcrops. The fossils are primarily isolated teeth recovered from vertebrate microfossil sites.

See also 

 List of dinosaur-bearing rock formations

Footnotes

References

Western Canadian Sedimentary Basin
Cretaceous Alberta
Campanian Stage
Upper Cretaceous Series of North America